Belgrave may refer to:

Places
Belgrave, Cheshire, an English village
Belgrave, Leicester an English district
Belgrave, Victoria, a suburb of Melbourne, Australia
Belgrave railway line
Belgrave railway station, Melbourne
Belgrave (Puffing Billy) railway station, Melbourne, a narrow-gauge railway station
Belgrave Square, a square in London, England
Belgrave, Tamworth, a district of Tamworth, England
Belgrave, Ontario, a community within North Huron municipality

Other uses
Belgrave (name), a surname and given name
Belgrave (band), a Canadian pop band
Belgrave (album), Belgrave's self-titled album
Belgrave Harriers, an athletics club in London, U.K.
Belgrave Trust, a green technology business, based in New York, U.S.
Château Belgrave, a winery in the Bordeaux region of France
Mount Belgrave, a mountain of Victoria Land, Antarctica
Belgrave Wanderers F.C., a football club in Guernsey